Doctor Kiss Kiss is the second hit single by British Disco Band 5000 Volts. It reached number 8 in the UK singles chart in August 1976. It peaked at number 45 in Australia

Personnel
 Linda Kelly - Lead vocals
 Martin Jay - guitar, backing vocals
 Martin Cohen - bass, backing vocals
 Mike Neslon - keyboards
 Kevin Wells - drums

References

Songs about physicians
Songs about kissing
1976 singles
Disco songs
1976 songs